Sir William Peter Griggs (1 November 1849 – 11 August 1920) was an English Member of Parliament for Ilford in north-east London.

Early life
Born at 123 Brick Lane in Bethnal Green, London, Griggs was 7 when his father died. He saved enough money to buy a barge which he operated along the Thames. Griggs was later involved in real estate development in Ilford and Upminster.

Politics
Griggs entered local politics in 1899 when he was elected to Ilford District Council, becoming the chairman in 1910. Since 1901, he had also been an Alderman of Essex County Council. Griggs stood for Parliament in 1910 in the Romford constituency but failed to win the seat. Griggs was successful at his next attempt during the 1918 General Election for the newly formed Ilford constituency with a majority of 11,249. He was knighted in 1916.

In 1920, he died at his home in Ilford after a long illness. This created a by-election which was won by fellow Coalition Conservative Fredric Wise. There is a memorial window dedicated by his widow, Lady Georgina ( Spriggs) at Trinity United Reformed Church, Upminster.

References

1849 births
1920 deaths
Members of the Parliament of the United Kingdom for English constituencies
UK MPs 1918–1922
Knights Bachelor